Zemitāni Station is a railway station in Riga, Latvia on the Riga–Skulte and Riga–Lugaži railway lines.

History 

The station opened in 1872 and was called Aleksandra Vārti (Alexander Gate) since at least 1889, after Tsar Alexander III. It was renamed in 1928 in honor of Colonel Jorģis Zemitāns, the commander of the Latvian Northern Brigade during the Latvian War of Independence. 

During the Nazi occupation of Latvia, the station carried the name Riga-Hohe Brücke (Riga-High Bridge). Following the re-occupation of Latvia by the Soviet Union in 1944, it carried the name Oškalni, in memory of pro-Soviet partisan Otomārs Oškalns.
In 1991, after the restoration of Latvian independence, the name Zemitāni was restored.

References 

Railway stations in Riga